Garrett Bradley (born 1986) is an American filmmaker and director of short films, feature films, documentaries, and television. She is known for blending cinematic genres to explore the larger sociopolitical significance of the everyday moments of her subjects' lived experience.

Early life and education 

Bradley was born in New York City in 1986 to abstract painters Suzanne McClelland and Peter Bradley. She studied religion at Smith College, then earned her MFA in Directing at UCLA.

Career 
Bradley's first feature was Below Dreams. which premiered at the 2014 Tribeca Film Festival. The film won a special jury award at the New Orleans Film Festival and was named a "slow burn beauty" by film critic Bilge Ebiri.

Bradley's documentary short America was called by Observer film critic Simran Hans the "most original film" she saw at the 2019 Sundance Film Festival, and was nominated for an Independent Documentary Award by the IDA. America set a new precedent as a short film in 2019 when it was given a week run at the Brooklyn Academy of Music, under the title "Garrett Bradley's America: A Journey Through Time". It was programmed alongside influenced and inspired works as well as a retrospective of Bradley's past films. Invited speakers included Saidiya Hartman, Julie Dash, and RaMell Ross. The event was in partnership with New York University's "Black Portraiture: V Memory and the Archive Past. Present. Future."

Bradley's first museum solo exhibition, American Rhapsody, was curated by Rebecca Matalon at the Contemporary Arts Museum Houston. She has participated in two group shows, the 2019 Whitney Biennial by Jane Panetta and Rujeko Hockley and Bodies of Knowledge at the New Orleans Museum of Art.

Bradley won the directing award in the U.S. documentary competition at the 2020 Sundance Film Festival for her first nonfiction feature, Time, becoming the first black woman to win the award. Time has been nominated for Best Documentary Feature at the 93rd Academy Awards.

Filmography 
Film and television

References

External links
 
Alone at the New York Times

1986 births
African-American film directors
University of California, Los Angeles alumni
Filmmakers from New York (state)
American women documentary filmmakers
Living people
American documentary filmmakers
Sundance Film Festival award winners
Peabody Award winners
21st-century African-American people
21st-century African-American women